Soltanali (also Romanized as Solţān‘alī and Solţān ‘Alī) is a village in Soltanali Rural District, in the Central District of Gonbad-e Qabus County, Golestan Province, Iran. At the 2006 census, its population was 1,405, in 249 families.

References 

Populated places in Gonbad-e Kavus County